The Olympiastadion is a sports stadium at Olympiapark Berlin in Berlin, Germany. It was originally built by Werner March for the 1936 Summer Olympics. During the Olympics, the record attendance was thought to be over 100,000. Today the stadium is part of the Olympiapark Berlin.

Since renovations in 2004, the Olympiastadion has a permanent capacity of 74,475 seats and is the largest stadium in Germany for international football matches. The Olympiastadion is a UEFA category four stadium.

Besides its use as an athletics stadium, the arena has built a footballing tradition. Since 1963, it has been the home of the Hertha BSC. It hosted three matches in the 1974 FIFA World Cup. It was renovated for the 2006 FIFA World Cup, when it hosted six matches, including the final. The DFB-Pokal final match is held each year at the venue. The Olympiastadion Berlin served as a host for the 2011 FIFA Women's World Cup as well as the 2015 UEFA Champions League Final.

It will host the 2024 UEFA European Football Championship final, including 5 other games.

History

1916–1934: Deutsches Stadion

During the 1912 Summer Olympics, the city of Berlin was designated by the International Olympic Committee (IOC) to host the 1916 Summer Olympics. Germany's proposed stadium for this event was to be located in Charlottenburg, in the Grunewald Forest, to the west of Berlin—thus the stadium was also known as Grunewaldstadion. A horse racing-course already existed there which belonged to the Berliner Rennverein, and even today the old ticket booths survive on Jesse-Owens-Allee. The government of Germany decided not to build in the nearby Grunewald forest, or to renovate buildings that already existed. Because of this desire, they hired the same architect who originally had built the "Rennverein", Otto March.

March decided to bury the stadium in the ground ("Erdstadion", in German). However, the 1916 Olympic Games were cancelled due to World War I. In the 1920s the first buildings of a school, the "Deutsches Sportforum" (German Sport Forum), dedicated to the teaching of professors of physical education and the study of sport science were built northeast of the stadium site. From 1926 to 1929, Otto March's sons (Werner and Walter) were assigned to build an annex for these institutions, though the finalization was delayed until 1936.

1936–1945: Olympiastadion

In 1931, the International Olympic Committee selected Berlin to host the 11th Summer Olympics. Originally, the German government decided merely to restore the earlier Olympiastadion (Olympic Stadium) of 1916, with Werner March again retained to do this.

When the Nazis came to power in Germany (1933), they decided to use the Olympic Games in 1936 for propaganda purposes. With these plans in mind, Adolf Hitler ordered the construction of a great sports complex in Grunewald named the "Reichssportfeld" with a totally new Olympiastadion. Architect Werner March remained in charge of the project, assisted by his brother Walter.

Construction took place from 1934 to 1936. It consisted of (east to west):  the Olympiastadion, the Maifeld (Mayfield, capacity of 50,000) and the Waldbühne amphitheater (capacity of 25,000), in addition to various places, buildings and facilities for different sports (such as football, swimming, equestrian events, and field hockey) in the northern part.

Werner March built the new Olympiastadion on the foundation of the original Deutsches Stadion, once again with the lower half of the structure recessed 12 metres (39.4 feet) below ground level.

The capacity of the Olympiastadion reached 110,000 spectators. It also possessed a special stand for Adolf Hitler and his political associates. At its end, aligned with the symmetrically-designed layout of the buildings of the Olympischer Platz and toward the Maifeld, was the Marathon Gate with a big receptacle for the Olympic Flame.

Maifeld

The Maifeld (Mayfield) was created as a huge lawn (11.2 hectares, 28 acres) for gymnastic demonstrations, specifically annual May Day celebrations by the government. The area was surrounded by 19 metres of land elevation (62 ft), even though the Olympiastadion (to the east) was only 17 metres (55 ft) high. The total capacity was 250,000 people, with 60,000 in the large stands that extended at the west end.

Also located there were the Langemarck-Halle (below) and the Bell Tower (rising high).  The walls were built with sturdy stone from the area of the Lower Alps, and also feature equine sculptures (work of Josef Wackerle).  This consisted of huge halls built under the stands of the Maifeld. Pillars were raised on which hung flags and shields commemorating all the forces that participated in a battle fought in Langemark (West Flanders, Belgium) on 10 November 1914, during the First World War. Since 2006, the ground floor is home to a public exhibit providing historical information on the area of the former Reichssportfeld.

During the 1936 Olympics, the Maifeld was used for polo and equestrian dressage events.

After the Second World War, the occupying forces of the British Army (Berlin Infantry Brigade) annually celebrated the King's or Queen's Official Birthday on the Maifeld and used it for a variety of sporting activities including cricket. Starting in 2012, Maifeld became home to the Berlin Cricket Club.

Bell Tower

The Bell Tower crowned the western end of the Reichs Sportfield planted amid the tiers of the Maifeld stands. It was 77 metres (247 ft) high. From its peak could be observed the whole city of Berlin. During the games, it was used as observation post by administrators and police officials, doctors and the media.
In the tower was the Olympic Bell. On its surface were the Olympic Rings with an eagle, the year 1936, the Brandenburg Gate, the date 1.-16. August and a motto between two swastikas: I call the youth of the world and 11. Olympic Games Berlin – although the games were the 10th (Summer) Olympics, they were the Games of the XI Olympiad.

The Bell Tower was the only part of the Reichssportfeld that was destroyed in the war. The Third Reich used the tower's structure to store archives (such as films). The Soviet troops set its contents on fire, turning the tower into a makeshift chimney. The structure emerged from the fire severely damaged and weakened.

In 1947, the British engineers demolished the tower; however, it was reconstructed accurately in 1962. The Olympic Bell (which had survived the fire and remained in its place in the tower) fell 77 metres and cracked and has been incapable of sounding since then. In 1956, the bell was rescued, only in order to be used as a practice target for shooting with anti-tank ammunition. The damaged old bell survives and serves as a memorial.

The recreation of the tower was carried out from 1960 to 1962, once again by the architect Werner March, following the original blueprints. The present tower became an important tourist destination offering a panorama of Berlin, Spandau, the Havel Valley, Potsdam, Nauen and Hennigsdorf.

The most significant battle around the Olympiastadion was in April 1945 when the Soviet army fought to capture it. This was during the final battle of the Second World War in Europe, with the total invasion of Berlin as the Allies' target.  The Olympiastadion survived the war almost untouched; it only suffered the impact of machine gun shots.

1945–1990: West Berlin era

After the war, the former Reichssportfeld became the headquarters of the British military occupation forces. The administration settled in the northeastern buildings designed by the March brothers in the 1920s, which the Third Reich had used for official sport organisations such as the Reich Academy of Physical Training and extended by 1936, adding the "Haus des deutschen Sports" (House of German Sports) and other buildings (which belong since 1994 to the Olympiapark Berlin, a central sporting facility of the City of Berlin). Soon, the British forces renovated war-damaged buildings but also converted interiors to their specific needs (one gymnasium was converted into a dining hall, another into a garage).  From 1951 to 2005, the Olympischer Platz had a giant antenna transmitting for all the portable radios in Berlin.

From then until 1994 and their departure, British forces held an annual celebration of the Queen's Official Birthday in the Maifeld with thousands of spectators from Berlin present. During the 1960s, American military and high school football teams introduced hundreds of thousands of Berliners to American football at the stadium in exhibition games.

During those years, Bundesliga football matches were played in the Olympiastadion, with Hertha BSC as local team. In the Maifeld, several competitions of football, rugby and polo were staged too. In the summers, the Waldbühne resumed its classical music concerts, and playing movies. The theatre was also used as an improvised ring for boxing matches.

1990–2004: Reunified Berlin

In 1998, Berliners debated the destiny of the Olympiastadion in light of the legacy it represented for Germany. Some wanted to tear the stadium down and build a new one from scratch, while others favoured letting it slowly crumble "like the Colosseum in Rome". Finally, it was decided to renovate the Olympiastadion.

FIFA chose it as one of the venues of the 2006 FIFA World Cup. The State of Berlin hired a consortium composed of Walter Bau AG and DYWIDAG that won the €45 million franchise. The consortium took charge of the operation of the facilities together with Hertha BSC and the Government of Berlin after the remodelling. On 3 July 2000, the renovation began with a ceremony presided over by the Chancellor Gerhard Schröder, accompanied by Eberhard Diepgen (Mayor of Berlin), Franz Beckenbauer and Prof. Dr. Ignaz Walter.

2004–present: Multi-purpose arena
The re-inauguration celebrations of the new Olympic Stadium were carried out on 31 July 2004, and 1 August 2004. On that day, Saturday, the party began with performances from Pink, Nena and Daniel Barenboim. It culminated at night with the opening ceremony. On day two, friendly matches were played between different categories of the club Hertha BSC and visiting teams. On 8 September 2004, Brazil played Germany.

From 2003 to 2007, the stadium was home to the Berlin Thunder.

In 2011, the venue hosted the World Culture Festival organized by the Art of Living where 70,000 people meditated for peace.

In 2018, the venue hosted the 2018 European Athletics Championships.

Renovation

Approximately  of sand was excavated. The lower tier of seating in the stadium was demolished and rebuilt at a completely different angle of inclination.

The roof rises  over the seats and is made up of transparent panels that allow sunlight to stream in during the day. The western portion (on the Marathon Arch) is open to reveal the Bell Tower to the spectators.

The conservation factor of the Olympiastadion as a historical monument was also considered, especially with respect to the preservation of the natural stone blocks. After criticisms, the colour of the athletics track around the game field was changed from red to blue, reflecting the colours of Hertha BSC.

The Olympiastadion was equipped with the latest technology in artificial illumination and sound equipment. It has 113 VIP stands, a set of restaurants, and two underground garages (for 630 cars). The total cost of the remodelling and amplification was €242 million.

Capacity
The new Olympic Stadium has the highest all-seated capacity in Germany. It has a permanent capacity of 74,475 seats. The upper tier has 31 seating rows at an average slope of 23° and houses 36,455 seats, of which 36,032 are regular seats, 290 are seats on the press stand and 133 are seats in skyboxes. The lower tier has 42 seating rows at an average angle of 25,4° and houses 38,020 seats, of which 32,310 are regular seats, 560 are box seats, 563 are lounge seats (expandable to 743), 4,413 are business seats and 174 are wheelchair spaces.

For certain football matches, such as those between Hertha BSC and FC Bayern München, the capacity can be temporarily expanded. This is made by the addition of mobile grandstand over the Marathon Arch. The extended capacity reached 76,197 seats in 2014.

The only stadiums in Germany that have higher total capacities are the Signal Iduna Park in Dortmund and the Allianz Arena in Munich. However, the Signal Iduna Park and the Allianz Arena have both seating and standing areas, and their all-seated capacities are lower than that of the Olympiastadion. The total capacity of the Allianz Arena is also lower than the extended capacity of the Olympiastadion.

Tenant
The stadium has been used as the home venue for the Bundesliga's Hertha BSC since 1963. In 1963, the Bundesliga was formed, and Hertha BSC participated by direct invitation, leaving its old stadium (the "Plumpe") to use the Olympiastadion. On 24 August, it played the first local match against 1. FC Nürnberg, with the final score 1–1.
However, in 1965, the German Football Association found Hertha BSC guilty of bribery and relegated them to the Regional Leagues.

In 1968, Hertha returned to the first division, and to the Olympiastadion, and in 1971 sold "Plumpe". The second half of the 1970s was quite successful for Hertha BSC Berlin. In 1979, it reached the semifinals of the UEFA Cup, but was defeated by Red Star Belgrade. Hertha reached the finals of the German Cup twice (1977 and 1979). In the 1980s, Hertha had a declining role in the Bundesliga, and fell to the Regional Leagues in 1986, although they later recovered reaching the Second Division (1988–1989).

With the demolition of the Berlin Wall in November 1989, a spontaneous feeling of sympathy between Hertha and 1. FC Union Berlin from Eastern Berlin arose, which culminated in a friendly match at the Olympiastadion with 50,000 spectators (27 January 1990). In 1990, Hertha returned to the First Division, although it fell again to the Second Division from 1991 until 1997.
Since 1997, the club has improved, climbing up the Bundesliga table and qualifying for the UEFA Champions League, with matches against top European teams like Chelsea and A.C. Milan.

Notable events

The Olympiastadion held the world record for the attendance of a baseball game during the 1936 Olympics thought to be over 100,000.

Since 1985, the stadium has hosted the finals of both the DFB-Pokal and its companion women's tournament, the Frauen DFB Pokal. However, it did not host the 2010 final of the Frauen DFB Pokal, which was held at Cologne's RheinEnergieStadion as part of an experimental test to host the event in a different city.

The stadium hosted five American Bowls between 1990 and 1994.  The stadium was also home to Berlin Thunder, an American football team in NFL Europa, from 2003 until the league's operator, the U.S. National Football League, closed down the money-losing competition in 2007.

The stadium also hosted The World Culture Festival. 2011 was to celebrate 30 years of service to humanity by Art of Living Foundation.

The stadium also hosts the Internationales Stadionfest, which also served as an IAAF Golden League event until 2010. The future of the event is currently unknown.

The stadium hosted the 2009 World Championships in Athletics where Usain Bolt broke the 100 metres and 200 metres world records.

1936 Summer Olympics

On 1 August 1936, the Olympics were officially inaugurated by the head of state Adolf Hitler, and the Olympic cauldron was lit by athlete Fritz Schilgen. Four million tickets were sold for all the events of the 1936 Summer Olympics. This was also the first Olympics with television transmission (25 viewing spaces were scattered all over Berlin and Potsdam) and radio transmissions in 28 languages (with 20 radio vans and 300 microphones).

The original idea of this Olympic torch relay was Carl Diem's, who was a political advisor to Propaganda Minister Joseph Goebbels, specialising in Olympic affairs. The Olympics were the subject of the propaganda film Olympia (1938) by Leni Riefenstahl.

Among the sport competitions, one of the most memorable events was the performance of the African-American track and field athlete Jesse Owens, representing the United States of America. Owens won the gold medal in the 100, 200, long jump and 4 x 100 relay. One of the main streets outside the stadium is named Jesse Owens Allee in recognition of his performance. The stadium also hosted the equestrian jumping, football, and handball events.

1974 FIFA World Cup Group A

Three matches from Group A (West Germany, Chile, East Germany and Australia) were played in the Olympiastadion. The third match, Australia vs Chile, was played in torrential rain. The historic match between the two German teams, however, was played in Hamburg. The hosts, West Germany, won the tournament.

2006 FIFA World Cup
The following matches were played in Berlin, for the 2006 FIFA World Cup:

2011 FIFA Women's World Cup 
In 2011, the Olympiastadion hosted Germany's opening match in the 2011 FIFA Women's World Cup. It was the only match in the tournament to be contested at the stadium.

2015 UEFA Champions League Final
In May 2013, the Olympiastadion was chosen as the venue for the 2015 UEFA Champions League Final. FC Barcelona won their fifth title and completed a second treble.

2024 UEFA European Football Championship Final
It will host the 2024 UEFA European Football Championship final, on 14 July 2024.

Concerts

Cultural references
The stadium was used as a location scene in the cinematic cold-war spy drama The Quiller Memorandum (1966).

In 2016, the stadium fielded the finish line of the 27th season of MTV's reality-competition series The Challenge, titled The Challenge: Battle of the Bloodlines.

Transport

U-Bahn
The underground train (U-Bahn) U2 takes visitors directly to the station Olympiastadion. It's a short walk from there to the stadium (East Gate entrance: 500m, South Gate entrance: 870m). Average travel time: 14 minutes from Zoologischer Garten, 24 minutes from Potsdamer Platz, 34 minutes from Alexanderplatz.

S-Bahn
The suburban rail  (S-Bahn) S3 and S9 takes visitors directly to the station Olympiastadion. It's a short walk from there to the stadium (South Gate entrance via exit Flatowallee: 200 m, East Gate entrance via exit Trakehner Allee: 250m). Average travel time: 7 minutes from Spandau station, 14 minutes from Zoologischer Garten, 22 minutes from Friedrichstrasse, 26 minutes from Alexanderplatz.

Bus
With the bus lines M49 and 218 visitors can reach the stop Flatowallee. It's a short walk from there to the stadium. With the bus line 143 visitors can reach the underground station Neu-Westend. From there it is a walk directly to the stadium. Visitors also can take the underground train and exit at the station Olympiastadion.

See also

Berlin
Football in Berlin
Sport in Berlin

Literature

 "Olympic Stadium Berlin" by Andreas Janowski. Published by Andreas Janowski Verlag under the label "sights-on-audio" 
 1936 Summer Olympics official report. Volume 1. pp. 141–9, 154–62.

References

External links

 Official Olympiastadion Site
 Picture galleries: An illustrative walk along the facilities of the Olympischer Platz.

Venues of the 1936 Summer Olympics
1974 FIFA World Cup stadiums
2006 FIFA World Cup stadiums
2009 World Championships in Athletics
2011 FIFA Women's World Cup stadiums
UEFA Euro 2024 stadiums
Athletics (track and field) venues in Germany
American Bowl venues
American football venues in Germany
Buildings and structures in Charlottenburg-Wilmersdorf
Football venues in Berlin
Gerkan, Marg and Partners buildings
Hertha BSC
SC Tasmania 1900 Berlin
Nazi architecture
Olympic athletics venues
Olympic equestrian venues
Olympic field hockey venues
Olympic football venues
Olympic handball venues
Olympic polo venues
Berlin
Sports venues in Berlin
Sports venues completed in 1936
1936 establishments in Germany
2018 European Championships venues
Albert Speer buildings